Guinothusa is a genus of freshwater crabs, found in South-East Asia.

Species
 Guinothusa beauvoisi (Rathbun, 1902): Vietnam
 Guinothusa harmandi (Rathbun, 1902): Vietnam
 Guinothusa phimaiensis Yeo & Ng, 2010: Thailand

References

External links

Gecarcinucidae
Freshwater crustaceans of Asia